Vladimir Yurevich Antipin (born April 18, 1970) is a former Kazakhstani professional ice hockey defenceman who participated at the 2010 IIHF World Championship and the 2006 Winter Olympics as a member of the Kazakhstan men's national ice hockey team. On September 15, 2012, Vladmir's wife was killed in an automobile accident in rural Kazakhstan. His son Viktor Antipin is also a hockey player, and played for the NHL's Buffalo Sabres. He is currently an ice hockey coach.

Career statistics

Regular season and playoffs

International

External links

1970 births
Amur Khabarovsk players
Avangard Omsk players
Barys Nur-Sultan players
Detroit Falcons (CoHL) players
Motor České Budějovice players
HC Lada Togliatti players
Metallurg Magnitogorsk players
Metallurg Novokuznetsk players
HC Sibir Novosibirsk players
Ice hockey players at the 1998 Winter Olympics
Ice hockey players at the 2006 Winter Olympics
Kazakhmys Satpaev players
Kazakhstani ice hockey defencemen
Kazakhstani people of Russian descent
Kazzinc-Torpedo players
Living people
Olympic ice hockey players of Kazakhstan
Kazakhstani expatriate sportspeople in the United States
People from Temirtau
Severstal Cherepovets players
Soviet ice hockey defencemen
Asian Games gold medalists for Kazakhstan
Medalists at the 1996 Asian Winter Games
Asian Games medalists in ice hockey
Ice hockey players at the 1996 Asian Winter Games
Kazakhstani expatriate sportspeople in the Czech Republic
Kazakhstani expatriate sportspeople in Russia
Expatriate ice hockey players in the United States
Expatriate ice hockey players in the Czech Republic
Expatriate ice hockey players in Russia
Kazakhstani expatriate ice hockey people